Kelardasht-e Gharbi Rural District is a rural district (dehestan) in Kelardasht District, Chalus County, Mazandaran Province, Iran. At the 2006 census, its population was 5,357, in 1,482 families. The rural district had 14 villages.

References 

Rural Districts of Mazandaran Province
Kelardasht County